El Faro de Gibraltar is a Spanish language free weekly newspaper published in Gibraltar since 2003. It is the only Spanish language newspaper currently published in Gibraltar and belongs to the Spanish media group Publicaciones del Sur, S.A..

References 

Spanish-language newspapers
Newspapers published in Gibraltar
Publications established in 2003